Fonuafo‘ou ("New land" in Tongan), formerly known as Falcon Island, is a submarine volcano in the western part of the Ha'apai group in Tonga. The volcano has created an island several times throughout history.

It was first spotted by the crew of the British ship HMS Falcon in 1867, while it was still a coral reef. On 11 October 1885, the volcano erupted and spouted tons of molten lava. Three days later, on 14 October 1885, the eruption created an island, which was named Falcon island by the British.

Several eruptions occurred in 1894, 1921, 1927, 1928, 1933 and 1936, consolidating the island and expanding its surface (6 km in diameter,  in height in 1949).

In 1949, another eruption caused the explosion and the collapse of the island, which disappeared underwater. New eruptions were recorded in 1970 and 1993. The volcano of Fonuafo'ou is currently  underwater.

References 

Volcanoes of Tonga
Submarine volcanoes
Active volcanoes
Former islands of Tonga